Geraint Morris (28 March 1941 –  12 July 1997) was a profound Welsh film and television director and producer.

His first work as a director was on The Onedin Line. Later contributions included Sutherland's Law, Barlow at Large and Juliet Bravo.

During the 1970s, Morris became a producer, beginning with the television police drama Softly, Softly: Task Force, from 1973 to 1976.

By 1980, Morris had completed his career change to dedicate his working life to TV producing. He helped create the highly successful and long running hospital drama Casualty (which has been on air since 1986) and contributed to the series for its first four seasons before leaving at the end of 1989. He also produced 12 episodes of the police drama The Bill during 1989, and his final contributions to television production were Wycliffe and Summer of Love, both of which were aired in 1997.

When the BBC series Casualty built a new set set in Cardiff they dedicated a ward to the late and much loved co-creator of the show Geraint Morris. The ward appears in many episodes and serves a great respect in connotation and dedication Morris had to TV. “Geraint Morris Ward” is located on the first floor of the set.

Geraint Morris died of lung cancer in July 1997, at the age of 56.

References

External links

1941 births
1997 deaths
Welsh film directors